Vasili Vasilievich Golovachov (born June 21, 1948, Russia) is a modern Russian science fiction writer, known in Russian-speaking countries for writing both hard science fiction and sci-fi/fantasy mixes. The works combines space science fiction, esotericism, Slavic neopaganism and pseudohistory.

List of works

 The Beast's Gospel ("Евангелие от зверя") series
 The Beast's Lair ("Логово зверя")
 The Exodus of the Beast ("Исход зверя")
 The Taming of the Beast ("Укрощение зверя")
 The Forbidden Reality ("Запрещенная реальность") series
 The Loner ("Одиночка")
 SMERSH-2 ("Смерш-2")
 The Interceptor ("Перехватчик")
 Third-Level Trouble ("Разборки третьего уровня")
 Breaking the Evil ("Излом зла")
 Exterminator of the Law ("Истребитель закона")
 Tornado ("Смерч")
 Catharsis ("Катарсис") series
 And the Retribution Is with Me (Man of Combat) ("И возмездие со мною [Человек боя]")
 Battlefield ("Поле боя")
 The Fight Is not Eternal ("Бой не вечен")
 I Guarantee Life ("Гарантирую жизнь")
 Don't Wake the Sleeping Genies ("Не будите спящих джиннов") series
 The Sleeping Genie ("Спящий джинн")
 The Cemetery of Genies ("Кладбище джиннов")
 The War with Genies ("Война с джиннами")
 The Return of the Genie ("Возвращение джинна")
 The Saviors of the Fan ("Спасатели Веера") series
 The Envoy ("Посланник") – Nikita Sukhov is an unintentional witness of the liquidation of the Envoy of the Forces of Light on Earth. Barely escaping alive himself, he realizes that he is now a target of the otherworldly assassins and can die at any moment. His only choice is to accept the challenge and become the new Envoy on the dangerous Path of the Sword in the Worldfan.
 The Deliverer ("Избавитель") – the collapse of the Worldfan threatens to destroy every living thing in the Multiverse. The heroes have an uneasy task ahead of them - to face the forces of Darkness and cross the chrons of the Fan. They must fight treacherous enemies, including Lucifer himself, aid the Seven Mages in their struggle against the Great Igvas, and prevent the Evil from altering all reality.
 Relict ("Реликт") series
 Unforeseen Meetings ("Непредвиденные встречи")
 Relict. Volume I ("Реликт. Том 1")
 The Coming ("Пришествие")
 The Return of the Wandering Constructor ("Возвращение блудного Конструктора")
 Children of Eternity ("Дети Вечности")
 Counter-intelligence ("Контрразведка")
 The Law of Change ("Закон перемен")
 The Absolute Player ("Абсолютный игрок")
 The Solo on the Broken String ("Соло на оборванной струне")
 The Vague Time ("Смутное время") series
 The Scourge of Times ("Бич времен")
 Cache ("Схрон")
 The Executioner of Times ("Палач времен")
 Magatsitls ("Магацитлы")
 The Adventures of Denis Molodtsov ("Приключения Дениса Молодцова")
 RTH, or Rule of Times of Harmony ("ВВГ, или Власть Времен Гармонии")
 To the Time of My Tears ("Ко времени моих слёз")
 Special Control ("Особый контроль")
 Regulum ("Регулюм")
 The Ruthless ("Беспощадный")
 The Masters ("Владыки")
 Demon ("Демон")
 Death Preserve ("Заповедник смерти")
 Kali Yuga ("Калиюга")
 Can Opener ("Консервный нож")
 The Corrector ("Корректировщик")
 Cryptozoy ("Криптозой")
 Deviation to Perfection ("Отклонение к совершенству")
 The Piranhas ("Пираньи")
 The Black Force ("Черная сила")
 The Black Time ("Черное время")
 The Black Man ("Черный человек")
 Sentenced to Light ("Приговоренные к свету")
 The Tree of Disappearing Times ("Древо исчезающих времен")
 The Edge of the World ("Край света")
 Fight without Rules ("Бой без правил")
 The War of Realities ("Война реальностей")
 Contacts of the Special Kind ("Контакты особого рода")
 The Face of the Demon ("Лик беса")
 The Rules of Combat ("Правила боя")
 The Predicted ("Предсказанное")
 The Heart of the Universe ("Сердце Вселенной")
 The Seekers of Death ("Искатели смерти")
 On the Other Side of the Fire ("По ту сторону огня")
 The Phantasms ("Фантазмы")
 Who Are We? Why Are We? The Experiment of Transpersonal Perception ("Кто мы? Зачем мы? Опыт трансперсонального восприятия")
 The Land of Wonders ("Земля чудес")
 The Devil's Fire Extinguisher ("Огнетушитель дьявола")
 Invasion into Reality ("Вторжение в реальность")
 Ultimatum ("Ультиматум")
 The Fourth Dimension ("Четвертое измерение")
 The Silver Time ("Серебряное время")
 The Masters of Reality ("Владыки реальности")
 The Extinguishers of the Suns ("Гасители солнц")
 Overcoming the Impossible ("Преодоление невозможного")
 Chronotwist ("Хроновыверт")
 The Compressed Spring ("Сжатая пружина")
 The Beyond ("Запределье")
 Requiem to the Time Machine ("Реквием машине времени")
 The Divinator ("Прорицатель")
 The War of Absolutes ("Война абсолютов")
 Playing with Fire ("Игра с огнем")

External links

 List of Golovachov's works.

Notes 

Ukrainian science fiction writers
Ukrainian fantasy writers
Russian science fiction writers
Russian fantasy writers
Ukrainian speculative fiction critics
Russian speculative fiction critics
Living people
1948 births